Tactical Girls is a Canadian digital series created and written by Melissa D'Agostino, Matt Campagna and Diana Bentley. The series stars Nicole Stamp, Melissa D'Agostino and Diana Bentley as three women who work in the trucking industry, but at night dress as soldiers for tactical missions. The first season was released in August 2016.

Cast 
Melissa D'Agostino as Dougy
Nicole Stamp as Stamper
Dian Bentley as Bender
Maria Vacratsis as The Boss
Ted Dykstra as Colonel McCullough
Kristian Bruun as Detective Laurence

Reception
The series has screened at festivals around the world, winning Best TV/Web Series at the Canada Independent Film Festival playing at the Seattle Web Fest  and winning at 5th Canadian Screen Awards for Melissa D'Agostino for Best Performance by an Actress in a Program or Series Produced for Digital Media.

References

External links
Tactical Girls on Highball.TV
IMDb

Canadian comedy web series
2016 web series debuts